Ubius is a monotypic genus of copepods belonging to the family Iveidae. The only species is Ubius hilli.

References

Copepods
Monotypic crustacean genera